Nee Venunda Chellam is a 2006 Indian Tamil-language action romance film, written and directed by L. Venkatesan, starring Ramesh, Gajala and Namitha in lead roles, with Thilakan, Vivek and Vincent Asokan playing supporting roles. The music is composed by Dhina and was a success. The film was a below average from film critics and audience.

Plot

The movie begins with Kannan falling in love with Geetha, a girl living in his neighborhood. Her father Viswanathan, a government employee, learns of Kannan's crushes on his daughter and plays all tricks and prevents Kannan from reaching out to his daughter.

Anjali also resides in the same locality. Ashok, a dreaded gangster and Anjali's uncle, makes plans to marry her. He ends up bashing all those who try to propose Anjali.

The turn of events results in Anjali mistaking Kannan of loving her. This results in Ashokan's men go behind Kannan's trail. Meanwhile, Kannan manages to meet Geetha and opens his heart. Learning of this, Anjali manages to kidnap Geetha and threatens Kannan to marry her.

Cast
 Ramesh as Kannan
 Gajala as Geetha Viswanathan
 Namitha as Anjali
 Thilakan as Viswanathan
 Vivek as Renigunda Reddy/Royapuram Mani
 Vincent Asokan as Ashok
 Nizhalgal Ravi as Kannan's father
 Thambi Ramaiah in a special appearance

Soundtrack
Soundtrack was composed by Dhina, and lyrics were written by Pa. Vijay, Snehan, Kabilan, and Yugabharathi.

Critical reception
Indiaglitz wrote "The movie has an interesting storyline, but the director seems to have lost his focus towards the second-half that takes the sheen away from it". Rediff wrote "When you have 'Jithan' Ramesh, Gajala and Namitha in the star cast, you can expect nothing but a potboiler like Nee venunda Chellam. However, except for Gajala and Thilakan, the actors all compete for a Most Wooden Performance award, with Ramesh clearly emerging as the winner". Sify wrote "There is nothing new in the story and director L.Venkatesan makes it too long at 2 hours 35 min, while the film loses its steam in 15 minutes after the first scene!".

References

2006 films
2000s Tamil-language films